The difference in the depth of modulation or DDM is used by instrument landing systems in conjunction with the associated airborne receiving equipment to define a position in airspace. DDM is usually expressed in percentage but may also be expressed in microamperes. Instrument landing system ground stations provide radio frequency signals that vary linearly in the depth of modulation from the centre or course line at a rate of 0.145% per meter . The two individual audio modulation frequencies and their associated sidebands are 150Hz and 90Hz. The DDM for a localizer at the outer extremity of the course sector is 15.5% or an electric current equivalent of 150 microamperes full scale deflection.

Method
A modulation depth comparison navigational aid (MDCNA), also known as an instrument landing system uses the concept of space modulation to provide guidance to aircraft when on final approach.

A carrier and sideband (CSB), and sideband only (SBO) signal, transmitted from localizer and glidepath antennas produce a space-modulated signal resulting from the vectorial addition of two or more audio signals that vary according to position of the receiving aircraft.
The difference between the two modulation depths produce an error current signal in the airborne receiver. When an aircraft follows the course line, the difference between the two frequencies is zero.
This difference is conventionally displayed by the deflection of a moving coil indicator or needle on an instrument known as a horizontal situation indicator (HSI).

See also

Instrument landing system
Amplitude modulation
Space modulation
Radio navigation
ICAO

References

Radio navigation